An apostolic nuncio (also known as a papal nuncio or simply as a nuncio) is an ecclesiastical diplomat, serving as an envoy or a permanent diplomatic representative of the Holy See to a state or to an international organization. A nuncio is appointed by and represents the Holy See, and is the head of the diplomatic mission, called an Apostolic Nunciature, which is the equivalent of an embassy. The Holy See is legally distinct from the Vatican City or the Catholic Church. In modern times, a nuncio is usually an archbishop.

An apostolic nuncio is generally equivalent in rank to that of ambassador extraordinary and plenipotentiary, although in Catholic countries the nuncio often ranks above ambassadors in diplomatic protocol. A nuncio performs the same functions as an ambassador and has the same diplomatic privileges. Under the 1961 Vienna Convention on Diplomatic Relations, to which the Holy See is a party, a nuncio is an ambassador like those from any other country. The Vienna Convention allows the host state to grant seniority of precedence to the nuncio over others of ambassadorial rank accredited to the same country, and may grant the deanship of that country's diplomatic corps to the nuncio regardless of seniority. The representative of the Holy See in some situations is called a Delegate or, in the case of the United Nations, Permanent Observer. In the Holy See hierarchy, these usually rank equally to a nuncio, but they do not have formal diplomatic status, though in some countries they have some diplomatic privileges.

In addition, the nuncio serves as the liaison between the Holy See and the Church in that particular nation, supervising the diocesan episcopate (usually a national or multinational conference of bishops which has its own chairman, elected by its members). The nuncio has an important role in the selection of bishops.

Terminology and history 

The name "nuncio" derived from the ancient Latin word nuntius, meaning "envoy" or "messenger". Since such envoys are accredited to the Holy See as such and not to the State of Vatican City, the term "nuncio" (versus "ambassador") emphasizes the unique nature of the diplomatic mission. The 1983 Code of Canon Law claims the "innate right" to send and receive delegates independent from interference of non-ecclesiastical civil power. Canon law only recognizes international law limitations on this right.

Formerly, the title Apostolic Internuncio denoted a papal diplomatic representative of the second class, corresponding to Envoy Extraordinary and Minister Plenipotentiary as a title for diplomatic representatives of states (cf. Article 14, par. 2 of the Vienna Convention). Before 1829, Internuncio was the title applied to the ad interim head of a mission when one Nuncio had left office and his replacement had not yet assumed it.

A legate a latere is a temporary papal representative or a representative for a special purpose.

Historically, the most important type of apocrisiary (a title also applying to representatives exchanged by a high prelate with a Patriarch) was the equivalent of a nuncio, sent by the Pope to the Byzantine Empire; during the fifth and sixth centuries, when much of Italy remained under Byzantine control, several popes were former apocrisiaries.

Pro-nuncio was a term used from 1965 to 1991 for a papal diplomatic representative of full ambassadorial rank accredited to a country that did not accord him precedence over other ambassadors and de jure deanship of the diplomatic corps. In those countries, the papal representative's precedence within the corps is no different from that of the other members of ambassadorial rank, so that he becomes dean only on becoming the senior member of the corps.

In countries with whom the Holy See does not have diplomatic ties, an Apostolic Delegate may be sent to act as a liaison with the Roman Catholic Church in that country, though not accredited to its government. Apostolic delegates have the same ecclesiastical rank as nuncios, but have no formal diplomatic status, though in some countries they have some diplomatic privileges. For example, an apostolic delegate served as the Holy See's de facto diplomatic representative to the United States and the United Kingdom, until both major Anglo-Saxon states with a predominantly Protestant tradition established full-fledged relations with the Holy See in the late twentieth century, allowing for the appointment of a Papal Nuncio (see the list of British Ambassadors to the Holy See). Archbishop Pio Laghi, for example, was first apostolic delegate, then pro-nuncio, to the United States during the Jimmy Carter, Ronald Reagan, and George H. W. Bush presidencies.

Apostolic delegates are also sent to regions such as the West Indies and the islands of the Pacific. These delegates are also appointed nuncio to at least some of the many states covered by their delegation, but the area entrusted to them also contains one or more territories that either are not independent states or are states that do not have diplomatic relations with the Holy See.

Article 16 of the Vienna Convention on Diplomatic Relations provides:
 Heads of mission shall take precedence in their respective classes in the order of the date and time of taking up their functions in accordance with Article 13.
 Alterations in the credentials of a head of mission not involving any change of class shall not affect his precedence.
 This article is without prejudice to any practice accepted by the receiving State regarding the precedence of the representative of the Holy See.

In accordance with this article, many states (even not predominantly Catholic ones such as Germany and Switzerland and including the great majority in central and western Europe and in the Americas) give precedence to the Nuncio over other diplomatic representatives, according him the position of Dean of the Diplomatic Corps reserved in other countries for the longest-serving resident ambassador.

Multilateral 
Holy See representatives called permanent observers are accredited to several international organisations, including offices or agencies of the United Nations, and other organizations either specialized in their mission or regional or both. A permanent observer of the Holy See is always a cleric, often a titular archbishop with the rank of nuncio, but there has been considerable variation between offices and over time.

See also 
 Apostolic Nunciature
 Papal Legate
 List of diplomatic missions of the Holy See

References

External links 

List of all Apostolic Nunciatures and Apostolic Delegations by Giga-Catholic Information
Nuncio from the Catholic Encyclopedia and elsewhere
CatholicHierarchy

 
Diplomats by role
Catholic ecclesiastical titles